Scolopendra cataracta is a species of centipede in the family Scolopendridae.

Discovery
George Beccaloni, an entomologist and curator at the Natural History Museum, London, found a specimen of S. cataracta near the Khao Sok National Park in 2000, while on honeymoon in Thailand.  Beccaloni described the centipede as "pretty horrific-looking: very big with long legs and a horrible dark, greenish-black colour" but what caught his attention was that it scurried into a stream rather than the forest when he turned over the stone it was hiding under on the stream bank – unusual behaviour as centipedes typically avoid water. It then ran along the stream bed and hid under a rock underwater.  After capturing the centipede, Beccaloni observed that it swam like an eel below the water's surface; his discovery was greeted with scepticism by an expert on Scolopendra, as these centipedes usually occur in dry habitats, and no amphibious species of centipede had been known until then.

Gregory Edgecombe, a colleague of Beccaloni's in London, and his Thai student Warut Siriwut collected two specimens near Laotian waterfalls and DNA analysis confirmed they belonged to a new centipede species which they named S. cataracta, from the Latin for waterfall.  There are only four known specimens of this species.  In addition to Edgecombe and Siriwut's specimens, Edgecombe confirmed that Beccaloni's specimen from 2000 was S. cataracta, and the Natural History Museum turned out to have a Vietnamese specimen from 1928 which had been misidentified.  Beccaloni is the only person to have observed the centipede swimming and has hypothesised that its ecological niche is based on "this species [going] into the water at night to hunt aquatic or amphibious invertebrates."  The description of the new species was published in the journal ZooKeys in 2016.

Description
It displays escape reactions when exposed, taking refuge underwater; and has been observed both running along stream beds and swimming with eel-like horizontal undulations of its body. Out of water, water rolls off the centipede's body leaving it dry as the surface is very hydrophobic.

Distribution
The species is apparently endemic to Southeast Asia, with specimens having been found in Laos, Thailand, and Vietnam.

References

cataracta
Arthropods of Laos
Arthropods of Thailand
Arthropods of Vietnam
Animals described in 2016
Taxa named by Gregory Edgecombe